The Podtatranská kotlina (literally Sub-Tatra Basin or Basin under Tatra(s)) is a basin in northern Slovakia, part of the Fatra-Tatra Area, which belongs to the Inner Western Carpathians.

Towns and cities include Ružomberok, Liptovský Mikuláš, Liptovský Hrádok, Svit, Poprad, Kežmarok, Spišská Belá and Podolínec.

Location and characteristics 

It borders:
Tatras in the north
Spišská Magura in the north-east
Levoča Hills in the east
Kozie chrbty in the south-east
Low Tatras in the south
Greater Fatra in the south-west
Choč Mountains in the north-west

The basin is divided into three sub-divisions: Liptovská kotlina (Liptov Basin), Popradská kotlina (Poprad Basin) and Tatranské predhorie, also called podhorie (Tatra Piedmont).

The border between the former named basins is also the drainage divide; the Váh River drains western part of the area and flows into Danube, which flows into the Black Sea, and the Poprad River drains the eastern part and flows through Dunajec into Vistula, which flows into the Baltic Sea.

The average altitude of the basin is from 700 to 800 m AMSL; the lowest point is near Ružomberok at 475 m and the highest near Štrba at around 900 m.

Originally a forested land, the basin has been transferred for agricultural use, with more varied relief being turned into meadows and pastures.

See also 
 Geography of Slovakia

References
Part or whole of the information is based on the corresponding article on the German Wikipedia

Landforms of Slovakia
Drainage basins of Europe